Arak University is the oldest state university of Markazi province located in Arak city. The university has been founded in 1971 as The College of Marjan (مدرسه ی عالی مرجان, Midresh-e i 'alâm Mirjan) with partnership of the University of Tehran and Tehran Tarbiat Moallem University. In 1989 the college attained university status. The university currently offers degrees in seven faculties in 135 fields for both undergraduate and graduate students.

Right now, Arak University is the largest state university of the Markazi province and more than 7,500 students are enrolled in its bachelor, master and PhD programs and more than 300 full-time professors are working in 8 faculties of the university.

Faculties 
1- Faculty of Science 
- Department of Biology
- Department of Mathematics

- Department of Chemistry

- Department of Physics

2- Faculty of Engineering
- Department of Chemical Engineering
- Department of Mechanical Engineering
- Department of Industrial Engineering
- Department of Materials Science and Engineering
- Department of Computer Engineering
- Department of Civil Engineering
- Department of Electrical Engineering

3- Faculty of Human Science
- Department of Theology and Islamic Studies

- Department of Educational Science
- Department of History

- Department of Psychology

4- Faculty of Agriculture and Environment
- Department of Agricultural Machinery
- Department of Water Science and Engineering
- Department of Animal Science
- Department of Environmental Science

- Department of Horticultural Science
- Department of Medicinal Plants

5- Faculty of Sport Sciences 
- Department of Physical Education and Sport Sciences

6- Faculty of Literature and Foreign Languages
- Department of Persian Language & Literature
- Department of Arabic Language & Literature
- Department of English Language & Literature 

7- Faculty of Art

- Department of Graphics

- Department of Drawing

- Department of Carpet
- Department of Handicrafts

8- Faculty of Economy and Administrative Sciences
- Department of Economy
- Department of Political Science

- Department of Industrial Management

- Department of Law

Universities in Iran
Educational institutions established in 1971
Education in Markazi Province
Buildings and structures in Markazi Province
Arak, Iran